George Ireland (died 1596) was the member of the Parliament of England for Great Bedwyn for the parliament of 1572 and for Appleby for the parliament of 1584.

References 

Members of Parliament for Great Bedwyn
Members of Parliament for Appleby
1596 deaths
Year of birth unknown
English MPs 1572–1583
English MPs 1584–1585